Pueblos jóvenes ("young towns") is the term used for the shanty towns that surround Lima and other cities of Peru. Many of these towns have developed into districts of Lima such as Comas, Los Olivos and Villa El Salvador.

Population 
Pueblos jóvenes were estimated to have over one million inhabitants in 1974. They were built on hillsides or beside rivers. By 2008, it was estimated that tens of millions of Peruvians were squatting land. Areas include Comas District, Los Olivos District and Villa El Salvador in Lima.

The shanty town of Medalla Milagrosa is composed of migrants from all over Peru. Others are populated by Black, Amerindian, and mestizo campesinos who since the 1940s have migrated in great waves from Peru's countryside in search of economic opportunity, turning Lima into the fourth-largest city in America. Like many other rapidly industrializing cities, Lima's job market has largely been unable to keep up with this influx of people, forcing many to accept any housing available. The Peruvian government has permitted these communities to continue largely because it realizes that, were they to eradicate them, the inhabitants would simply move elsewhere in the city's peripheral areas.

Gallery

See also 
 Arrabal (Puerto Rico) 
 Asentamiento (Guatemala)
 Barrio (Venezuela) 
 Cantegril (Uruguay) 
 Favela (Brazil) 
 Campamento (Chile) 
 Villa Miseria (Argentina) 
 Ghetto (United States)
 Colonia (border settlement)

References

Society of Peru
Populated places in Peru
Human habitats
Shanty towns in South America
Slums in South America
Geography of Lima